The Adelaide International is a professional tennis tournament played on outdoor hard courts in Adelaide, South Australia at the Memorial Drive Tennis Centre. The tournament is held in January or February, and forms part of the WTA and ATP tours. The event is part of the lead-up to the first Grand Slam tournament of the season, the Australian Open.

History
The establishment of the Brisbane International in 2009 saw the city of Adelaide miss out on continuing to host an ATP or WTA lead-up event to the Australian Open. Over the next ten years Adelaide hosted the World Tennis Challenge, an exhibition event played featuring past players. The unveiling of the multi-city ATP Cup competition, held around the same time, resulted in the abolition of the Hopman Cup and the condensing of other tournaments, thereby allowing sufficient room in the calendar for the Adelaide International. In February 2019, the South Australian Government announced it would invest $10 million to construct a canopy-roof structure over the Memorial Drive Tennis Centre, after securing a five-year deal with Tennis Australia to host the new event at the upgraded facility. The new tournament was launched later that year, with then-world number four and two-time Grand-Slam champion Simona Halep being confirmed as the first player to play in the 2020 Adelaide International. The new international tournament was a combined WTA Premier and ATP 250 event.

In 2021, a WTA-only tournament was held after the Australian Open, from February 22–27.

In 2022, there were two back-to-back Adelaide Internationals from January 1st to January 14th. The events were combined ATP 250 and WTA 250 tournaments with Gaël Monfils and Ashleigh Barty winning the men's and women's  singles in the first tournament, and Thanasi Kokkinakis and Madison Keys winning the men's and women's singles in the second tournament.

Finals

Men's singles

Women's singles

Men's doubles

Women's doubles

See also

 South Australian Championships 
 Australian Hard Court Championships
 Australian Open Series

References

External links
Official website

 
ATP Tour 250
WTA Tour
Hard court tennis tournaments
Sports competitions in Adelaide
Tennis tournaments in Australia
Recurring sporting events established in 2020
2020 establishments in Australia
Annual sporting events in Australia
Tennis in South Australia